Hippurarctia taymansi is a moth of the  family Erebidae. It was described by Rothschild in 1910. It is found in the Democratic Republic of Congo, the Republic of Congo and Cameroon.

References

 Natural History Museum Lepidoptera generic names catalog

Syntomini
Moths described in 1910